Lone Hand Saunders is a 1926 American silent Western film directed by B. Reeves Eason and starring Fred Thomson, Bess Flowers, and Frank Hagney.

Cast
 Fred Thomson as Fred Saunders 
 Bess Flowers as Alice Mills 
 Billy Butts as Buddy 
 Frank Hagney as Buck 
 Albert Prisco as Charlie 
 William Dyer as Sheriff 
 William Courtright as Dr. Bandy

References

Bibliography
 Donald W. McCaffrey & Christopher P. Jacobs. Guide to the Silent Years of American Cinema. Greenwood Publishing, 1999.

External links

 

1926 films
1926 Western (genre) films
American black-and-white films
Films directed by B. Reeves Eason
Film Booking Offices of America films
Silent American Western (genre) films
1920s English-language films
1920s American films